Railways of Australia Container Express or RACE was a slightly wider version of the standard ISO shipping container able to take 2 Australia Standard Pallets side by side. More than 1,000 units were operated by the Railways of Australia, an association of the government-owned railways which comprised Australian National, the State Rail Authority of New South Wales, Queensland Railways, the Victorian State Transport Authority and Westrail. These entities operated in Australia prior to privatisation of freight services.

The RACE containers were developed in 1974 in New South Wales by the Public Transport Commission, and built by Freighter Industries Ltd. The RACE general container was designed to accommodate 20 standard  pallets stacked in two levels. There were also ISO RACE containers for non-palletised freight, as well as ventilated, refrigerated and side-loading containers.

Models 
SDS Models and On Track Models both have made these containers in HO scale

See also
Containerization
Intermodal container

References

Rail freight transport in Australia
Shipping containers